Barkley Miguel Panzo (born 9 September 1992 in Paris) is a French-Angolan footballer who currently plays as a striker or a winger for Maltese club Vittoriosa Stars in Maltese First Division.

Career
Panzo played for the Real Madrid youth academy between 2005 and 2008. In 2008, he signed for FK Baník Most, then a second-division Czech club.

He played in England between 2009 and 2012, training with the Queens Park Rangers' under-18s and playing for Woking F.C., Walton & Hersham F.C., Hendon F.C., Hillingdon Borough F.C., Northwood F.C. and Cambridge City F.C. He was selected for training with the Angolan national team in Lubango in 2015 while playing for AC Brévinois (AC St Brevin) in the fourth regional tier in Saint-Brevin-les-Pins, France, having scored 16 goals that season. In France between 2012 and 2017, he also played for FC Sarlat, AS Moulins, TVEC Les Sables-d'Olonne and the US Orléans B team. He signed for Syrianska FC in the Superettan in 2017, with the Syrianska and Superettan websites claiming that he scored a goal in three matches for Angola.

On 3 February 2018, Panzo's club FK Panevėžys published a disclaimer saying that they signed Panzo after he demonstrated his skills on the pitch. They stated that they did not know about a "possible match in the Angolan squad" and they apologized for the appearance of incorrect information on their website. On 15 January 2019, he signed for the Vittoriosa Stars in the Maltese First Division.

References

External links

1992 births
Living people
Angolan footballers
French footballers
French people of Angolan descent
Association football forwards
Woking F.C. players
AS Moulins players
US Orléans players
Syrianska FC players
Hillingdon Borough F.C. players
Northwood F.C. players
Hendon F.C. players
Walton & Hersham F.C. players
Cambridge City F.C. players
FK Panevėžys players
Vittoriosa Stars F.C. players
Footballers from Paris